Eucalyptus dolorosa, commonly known as the Mount Misery mallee or Dandaragan mallee, is a species of eucalypt that is endemic to Western Australia. It is a mallee with a short skirt of rough flaky bark at the base of the trunk, smooth pale greyish brown above, lance-shaped to curved adult leaves, flower buds in groups of seven, white flowers and cup-shaped to spherical fruit.

Description
The bark on the lower  of the trunk is rough flaky and grey to yellowish brown, smooth, pale grey-brown above. It blooms between February and March producing yellow flowers.

Taxonomy
Eucalyptus dolorosa was first formally described by the botanists Ian Brooker and Stephen Hopper in 1993 in the journal Nuytsia. The specific epithet is taken from the Latin word dolorosus meaning "painful" or "sad", in reference to the only locality where the species is found.

The species is part of the Eucalyptus subgenus series Diversiformae, a group of mallees that all have adult leaves held erect, buds with a single unscarred operculum and pyramidal seeds. The other species in this series include E. erectifolia, E. platydisca, E. diversifolia, E. todtiana, E. lateritica, E. pachyloma and E. buprestium.

Distribution and habitat
Mount Misery mallee is found on a hillside in a small area of the Wheatbelt region of Western Australia around Dandaragan where it grows in lateritic soils.

The plant is part of a mallee heath community over low scrub, situated between large ironstone boulders. Other species found in the scrub include Eucalyptus arachnaea, E. gittinsii, E. pluricaulis, E. abdita, Hakea lissocarpha, H. obliqua, H. undulata, Calothamnus quadrifidus, Melaleuca radula, Acacia pulchella and Eremaea asterocarpa.

Conservation status
This species is listed as endangered by the Environment Protection and Biodiversity Conservation Act 1999 and as "Threatened Flora (Declared Rare Flora — Extant)" by the Department of Environment and Conservation (Western Australia). A total of 25 individual plants in eight population groups remain in a small remnant of natural bush on a private property on the summit and slopes of Mount Misery, a lateritic hill east of Cataby in Western Australia.

References

dolorosa
Eucalypts of Western Australia
Myrtales of Australia
Plants described in 1993
Taxa named by Ian Brooker
Taxa named by Stephen Hopper